The Sandra Day O'Connor College of Law (ASU Law) is one of the professional graduate schools at Arizona State University in Phoenix, Arizona. The school is located in the Beus Center for Law and Society on ASU's downtown Phoenix campus. The law school was created in 1965 as the Arizona State University College of Law upon recommendation of the Arizona Board of Regents, with the first classes held in the fall of 1967. The school has held American Bar Association accreditation since 1969 and is a member of the Order of the Coif. The school is also a member of the Association of American Law Schools. In 2006, the law school was renamed in honor of retired United States Supreme Court Justice Sandra Day O'Connor.

ASU Law is ranked 30th overall in the nation by U.S. News & World Report, the 12th-highest public law school, and the higher-ranked law school of the two in Arizona.

History
The school was previously located in Armstrong Hall, adjacent to the Ross-Blakley Law Library on ASU's Tempe campus. In 2012, the school announced plans to relocate to Arizona State University Downtown Phoenix campus.  The first classes held in the new building, the Beus Center for Law and Society, were in the fall semester of 2016. The new law building cost $129 million, paid for with construction bonds, private donations and the city of Phoenix, which provided land and $12 million. The building is named for Phoenix attorney Leo Beus, who donated $10 million to the law school in 2014.

Apart from the law school, the Beus Center also houses the Lincoln Center for Applied Ethics, The McCain Institute for International Leadership, the Sandra Day O'Connor Institute, Arizona Voice for Crime Victims, the Arizona Justice Project, and the ASU Alumni Law Group.

Best Choice Schools ranked the Beus Center the 6th most impressive law school building in the world.

Employment 
According to ASU's official 2013 ABA-required disclosures, 84.3% of the Class of 2013 obtained full-time, long-term, JD-required or JD-advantage employment nine months after graduation. ASU Law ranks No. 19 in the nation and No. 5 among public law schools for successful postgraduate job placement in great lawyer jobs. As a regional school, the vast majority of ASU graduates find employment in Arizona after graduation. Of the 204 graduates in 2013, 172 were employed in Arizona, with five in California and four in Texas. Additionally, ASU has an underemployment score of 12.7% on lawschooltransparency.com, and 8.8% of graduates are employed in school-funded positions.

According to ASU's official 2017 ABA-required disclosures, 88.8% of the Class of 2017 obtained full-time, long-term, JD-required or JD-advantage employment nine months after graduation.

According to ASU's official 2020 ABA-required disclosures, 87.4% of the Class of 2020 obtained full-time, long-term, JD-required or JD-advantage employment nine months after graduation.

The class of 2020 had 175 students obtain jobs in Arizona within nine months of graduation. The remaining 22% of the class who obtained jobs within nine months of graduation did so outside of Arizona, including 16 jobs in California, 6 in Washington D.C., and 5 jobs in foreign countries.

Costs
For the 2020–21 academic year, the yearly tuition for residents is $28,058, and the tuition for non-residents is $47,302. In 2016, the school had the highest bar passage rate in Arizona, with 77% of first-time test takers passing, compared with 74% for University of Arizona, and 25% for Arizona Summit Law School. The state's total passage rate was 64% for first-time test takers and 53% overall.

Clinical programs
The Sandra Day O'Connor College of Law has 13 clinics, which offer students opportunities to practice law in a variety of settings with people who have real legal problems. Under the supervision of faculty members who are experts in their subject matter, students manage real cases and represent clients in hearings and trials before courts and administrative agencies, assist in the commercialization and monetization of new technologies, and mediate cases pending in the judicial system.

 Civil Justice Clinic
 First Amendment Clinic
 Immigration Law & Policy Clinic
 Indian Legal Clinic
 Lodestar Mediation Clinic
 Lisa Foundation Patent Law Clinic
 Post Conviction Clinic
 Prosecution Clinic
 Public Defender Clinic
 Technology Ventures Services Group

Centers and other academic programs
 The Center for Law, Science & Innovation is focused on the intersection of law with science and technology. Its 26 faculty fellows together with numerous associated faculty, students, and research fellows explore law and policy in a world of rapidly changing technologies, through scholarship, education, and policy dialogue.
 The Center for Law & Global Affairs supports and inspires research, education and practice regarding emerging forms of transnational governance that extend beyond the traditional paradigms of international law. The center supports research and scholarship, develops courses and experiential learning programs, designs and manages international projects and engages in outreach with academic, policy and community partners.
 The Indian Legal Program was established in 1988 to provide legal education and generate scholarship in the area of Indian law and undertake public service to tribal governments. The program was founded by professor William Canby, Jr. who served as director until his appointment to the United States Court of Appeals for the Ninth Circuit.
 The Barrett and O'Connor Center opened in 2018 to solidify the University's contacts with the capital city. The center houses ASU's Washington, D.C.-based academic programs, including the Washington Bureau of the Walter Cronkite School of Journalism and Mass Communication, the Sandra Day O'Connor College of Law Rule of Law and Governance program, the Capital Scholars program, and the McCain Institute's Next Generation Leaders program, among many others. In addition to hosting classes and internships on-site, special lectures and seminars taught from the Barrett & O'Connor Washington Center are connected to classrooms in Arizona through video-conferencing technology. The Barrett and O'Connor center is located at 1800 I St NW, Washington, DC 20006, very close to the White House.
 The ASU California Center is located in Santa Monica, California, and serves as a gateway to the Los Angeles market for ASU graduate students. The Center offers classes for the College of Law, among other graduate programs at ASU.

Notable lecturers and professors
 Angela M. Banks
 Paul Bender, constitutional scholar
 Sarah Buel
 Ehsan Zaffar
 Andrew Hurwitz, Judge, United States Court of Appeals for the Ninth Circuit
 John Clint Williamson, former United States Ambassador-at-Large for War Crimes Issues
 Scott Bales, Chief Justice (Ret.), Arizona Supreme Court
 Michael J. Saks, fourth most cited scholar in the field of Law and Social Science.
 Allan H. "Bud" Selig, former commissioner of Major League Baseball.

Law journals
 Arizona State Law Journal
 Jurimetrics: The Journal of Law, Science, and Technology
 Law Journal for Social Justice
 Arizona State Sports and Entertainment Law Journal
 Corporate and Business Law Journal

Notable alumni
 Michael Daly Hawkins ('70) – Senior Judge, United States Court of Appeals for the Ninth Circuit
 Roslyn O. Silver ('71) – Chief Judge, United States District Court for the District of Arizona
 Harriet C. Babbitt ('72) – former U.S. Ambassador to the Organization of American States and Deputy Administrator of the U.S. Agency for International Development
 H. Bartow Farr, III ('73) - former law clerk to Justice William Rehnquist
 Ruth McGregor ('74) – former Chief Justice, Arizona Supreme Court
 Ed Pastor ('74) – U.S. Congressman, Arizona's 4th congressional district
 Charles G. Case II ('75) – former Judge, United States Bankruptcy Court, District of Arizona
 Barry G. Silverman ('76) – Judge, United States Court of Appeals for the Ninth Circuit
 Terry Goddard ('76) – former Arizona Attorney General
 Michael D. Ryan ('77) – former Justice, Arizona Supreme Court
 Tena Campbell ('77) – Senior Judge, United States District Court for the District of Utah
 Phil Gordon ('78) – former Mayor of Phoenix, Arizona
 Douglas L. Rayes ('78) – Judge, United States District Court for the District of Arizona
 Grant Woods ('79) – former Arizona Attorney General
 Rebecca White Berch ('79) – Chief Justice, Arizona Supreme Court
 Richard D. Mahoney ('79) – former Arizona Secretary of State
 Fred DuVal ('80) – chairman, Arizona Board of Regents
 Rick Romley ('81) – former County Attorney for Maricopa County, Arizona
 George McCaskey ('81) – chairman, Chicago Bears
 Michael J. Ahearn ('82) – chairman and former CEO, First Solar
 Steven E. Carr ('84) – First and only American ever elected to the highest governing body of the International Red Cross and Red Crescent Movement
 David Yerushalmi ('84) – Co-founder and Senior Counsel of the American Freedom Law Center
 Ann Scott Timmer ('85) – Justice, Arizona Supreme Court
 John Lopez IV ('89) – Justice, Arizona Supreme Court
 Joe Rogers ('89) – former Lieutenant Governor of Colorado
 Bridget S. Bade ('90) – Judge, 9th Circuit Court of Appeals, former United States magistrate judge for the District of Arizona.
 Gloria Navarro ('92) – Judge, United States District Court for the District of Nevada
 Rachel Mitchell ('92) – Prosecutor who questioned Dr. Christine Blasey Ford during Brett Kavanaugh's hearing for confirmation to the United States Supreme Court.
 Diane Humetewa ('93) – Judge, United States District Court for the District of Arizona
 James Hamm ('97) –  private criminal justice consultant, qualified in courts as an expert on prison policy and procedure, time computations
 Jerod E. Tufte ('02) – Justice, North Dakota Supreme Court
 Kyrsten Sinema ('04) – U.S. Senator from Arizona, former U.S. Representative from Arizona's 9th congressional district
 Courtney Ekmark ('20) – played basketball on two NCAA championship teams before transferring to ASU in 2016; enrolled in O'Connor in 2017 and played for the Sun Devils

References

External links

 

Arizona State University
Law schools in Arizona
Educational institutions established in 1965
1965 establishments in Arizona
Education in Tempe, Arizona
Buildings and structures in Tempe, Arizona
Universities and colleges in Maricopa County, Arizona